Photharam railway station is a railway station located in Photharam Subdistrict, Photharam District, Ratchaburi.

Train services 
 Rapid 169/170 Bangkok-Yala-Bangkok
 Rapid 177/178 Thon Buri-Lang Suan-Thon Buri
 Ordinary 251/252 Bang Sue Junction-Prachuap Khiri Khan-Bang Sue Junction
 Ordinary 254/255 Lang Suan-Thon Buri-Lang Suan
 Ordinary 261/262 Bangkok-Hua Hin-Bangkok
 Ordinary 351/352 Thon Buri-Ratchaburi-Thon Buri

References 

Railway stations in Thailand